The network of primary highways (freeways or not) in Catalonia, Spain, can be divided into two groups: highways managed by the Spanish Government and highways managed by the Generalitat de Catalunya (Catalonia's Government).

The first group are itineraries included in the Red de Interés General del Estado (Spanish highways network), which generally either serve as long-distance connectors beyond the Catalonia's field or either have a special strategical importance. They are mainly autopistas or autovías (Catalan: autovies) but some regular roads can also be found (most of them are in process or in prospect of being upgraded to autovía).

The second group are itineraries mainly used for Catalonia's internal transport. However, some of these highways (such as C-31, C-32 or C-58) are main communication paths and suffer from heavy traffic.

Primary highways managed by the Spanish Government
The following highways (freeways or not) are managed by the Spanish Government. The list is arranged by itineraries, some of them formed by sections of different categories. The category field indicates if the sections are autopistas (generally tolled freeways under a concession contract), autovías or simple single-lane roads.

Primary highways managed by the Generalitat de Catalunya
The primary highways managed by the Catalan Government serve mainly for transport inside Catalonia.

Since year 2004, their denomination follows the next rules:

The letter C before the hyphen (for example, C-31) means that the road is managed by the Generalitat de Catalunya
The first number after the hyphen (for example, C-31) indicates the main bound:
1 for south-northbound highways
2 for west-eastbound highways
3 for southwest-northeastbound highways
4, 5 and 6 for southeast-northwestbound highways
The second number after the hyphen (for example, C-31) indicates the ordinal number within the category indicated by the first number. For example, for south-northbound highways, the lowest number correspond to the westernmost highway, whereas the highest number is for the easternmost one.

South-Northbound highways

West-Eastbound highways

Southwest-Northeastbound highways

 toll road

Southeast-Northwestbound highways

References

External links
Website of the Departament d'Obres Públiques de la Generalitat de Catalunya
Portal de la mobilitat
Basic Catalonia's Roads Net
New codification for primary highways managed by the Generalitat de Catalunya (in Catalan and Spanish)

Roads in Catalonia
Highways
Catalonia